Goonch or goonch catfish is a common name for two South Asian species of sisorid catfish in the genus Bagarius: